Han Chae-ah (born Kim Kyung-ha on March 24, 1982) is a South Korean actress. She is best known for her 2012 television dramas, playing a detective in Hero, and a Japanese collaborator in Bridal Mask.

Personal life
According to Mystic Entertainment on March 8, 2018, Han married South Korean football legend Cha Bum-kun's youngest son Cha Se-jji on May. On April 4, 2018, Han announced on her instagram that she is expecting a first child after being six weeks pregnant. Their wedding ceremony was held at a hotel in Seoul on May 6, 2018.

Filmography

Film

Television series

Web series

Television show

Music video

Awards and nominations

References

External links
 
 
 

South Korean television actresses
South Korean film actresses
Living people
1982 births
People from Busan
21st-century South Korean actresses